Isabella Noemi Pappas (born 21 August 2002) is an actress. She began her career on the London stage, earning Laurence Olivier and WhatsOnStage Award nominations. On television, she is known for her roles in the ITV series Finding Alice (2021) and the Disney series The Villains of Valley View (2022–present).

Early life
Pappas was born in northern Italy and spent her early childhood on a farm. Her father is a pilot and her mother is an autism specialist. She lived in Japan for two years for her mother's work. The family then settled in Chiswick, West London when she was 11. She attended Sylvia Young Theatre School and later Arts Educational School (ArtsEd) for sixth form, studying Drama and English Literature. She also participated in the British Theatre Academy and  Michael Xavier's MX Masterclass.

Career
Upon moving to London at 11, Pappas made her debut in the 2014 production of The Nether at the Royal Court Theatre in the role of Iris. The production moved to the Duke of York's Theatre on the West End in 2015. 

Pappas then starred as the titular Annie! on the show's 2015 tour around the UK. She made her television debut as Sarah Waingrow in the 2016 ITV crime drama miniseries Paranoid. She played Nina in the Stockwell Playhouse production of In the Heights in 2017. This was followed in 2018 by roles in 13 at Porthcurno's Minack Theatre, the Theatre Royal Stratford East's Terror at The Sweetshop, and Bring It On: The Musical at Southwark Playhouse.

For her performance as Cassidy Kramer-Lafayette in the 2019 run of the play Appropriate at the Donmar Warehouse, Pappas was nominated for the WhatsOnStage Award for Best Supporting Actress in a Play. She returned to television with guest appearances in the CBBC musical Almost Never in 2019 and the Channel 4 comedy-drama Home in 2020.

Pappas landed her first main television role as Charlotte Walsh, the daughter of Keeley Hawes' titular character, in the 2021 ITV comedy-drama Finding Alice. She was then cast a Disney pilot (working titles included Amy from Amarillo and Meet the Mayhems), which became The Villains of Valley View and premiered in 2022 on Disney Channel and Disney+. Pappas has an upcoming role in the film Beach Boys.

Filmography

Stage

Awards and nominations

References

External links
 
 Isabella Pappas at Spotlight

Living people
Actresses from London
Alumni of the Sylvia Young Theatre School
Italian emigrants to the United Kingdom
Italian expatriates in England
People from Chiswick